The coat of arms of King's College London in London, England, are blazoned: on a Pale Azure between two Lions rampant respectant Gules an Anchor Gold ensigned by a Royal Crown proper on a Chief Argent an Ancient Lamp proper inflamed Gold between two Blazing Hearths also proper.

The current coat of arms was developed after the mergers of the college with Queen Elizabeth College and Chelsea College of Science and Technology, University of London in 1985. The Rampant Lions are from Chelsea College's crest and the Blazing Hearths are from Queen Elizabeth College's. The arms incorporates aspects of the heraldry of the two colleges. A warrant for the use of the current arms was granted by the College of Arms, and the right to use the Royal Crown in the armorial achievement was granted by Queen Elizabeth II in 1995.

Original coat of arms

The original coat of arms used from 1829 to 1985 is that of George IV, who was the King at the time of foundation of the college. The original arms is displayed on the Royal Charter of King's College London.

The crest and supporters are blazoned: On a Helm with a Wreath Or and Azure Upon a Book proper rising from a Coronet Or the rim set with jewels two Azure (one manifest) four Vert (two manifest) and two Gules a demi Lion Gules holding a Rod of Dexter a female figure habited Azure the cloak lined coif and sleeves Argent holding in the exterior hand a Lond Cross botony Gold and sinister a male figure the Long Coat Azure trimmed with Sable proper shirt Argent holding in the interior hand a Book proper.

There is no surviving correspondence in the King's College London Archives and at the College of Arms regarding the choice of the original coat of arms.  A wide variety of unofficial adaptations have been used during the college history. The original arms can still be seen at the entrance to the 19th century King's Building at the Strand Campus.

The King's College London coat of arms is only used on formal documents, including examination certificates, formal invitations and graduation materials, and it acts as a legitimising device on official legal titles and documents.

See also
Armorial of UK universities
King's College London

References

King's College London
King's College London
King's College London
King's College London
King's College London
King's College London